is a mountain located in the towns of Ikeda and Ibigawa, in Ibi District, Gifu Prefecture, Japan.

Geography
Mount Ibuki, the namesake of the mountain range, lies to the east-northeast of Mount Ikeda. The mountain is protected as part of the Ibi Sekigahara Yōrō National Park (揖斐関ヶ原養老国定公園).

Activities
Because there are no other mountains to block the view from the eastern side of Mount Ikeda, climbers can easily see the cities of Gifu and Ōgaki in Gifu Prefecture, and Ichinomiya and, if conditions are clear enough, Nagoya in Aichi Prefecture. Because of the clear view, it is one of famed spots for night views in the Tōkai region.

Also, because of the clear space and favorable winds on the eastern side, it is popular for many sky sports, such as hang gliding and paragliding.

References

Ikeda, Mount
Ibi District, Gifu